Nathan Hirayama (born 23 March 1988) is a Canadian former rugby player. His primary position was fly-half, however, but he also played fullback. He played for both the Canadian national team and the Canadian sevens team. At club level, Hirayama played for the University of Victoria in the British Columbian Premiership and the BC Bears in the Canadian Rugby Championship.

National team

Fifteens
Hirayama was selected for the Canadian national team to attend the 2007, 2011 and 2015 Rugby World Cups, although he did not play any games in 2007. He appeared as a substitute two of Canada's four 2011 World Cup group stage matches. He was Canada's starting fly-half for the 2015 World Cup, playing in all four group stage matches and recording 20 points.

Sevens
Hirayama debuted for the Canadian sevens team in the 2006 Dubai Sevens in the IRB Sevens World Series at age 18. Two years later he debuted for the Canadian national men's team against Portugal in Lisbon. He was selected for the 2013 Rugby World Cup Sevens in Russia helping Canada to win the Plate competition and finishing as the tournament's top scorer with 49 points.
Hirayama was a part of Canada's rugby sevens team at the 2010, 2014, and 2018 Commonwealth Games. Hirayama has also competed at the Pan American Games, winning gold in 2011 and 2015, and silver in 2019.

In June 2021, Hirayama was named to Canada's 2020 Summer Olympics team. He will be Canada's flag-bearer at the opening ceremony games alongside Miranda Ayim. He announced his retirement from all forms of rugby in September 2021. At the time of his retirement, he was ranked third on the HSBC World Rugby Sevens Series all-time points-scoring list, with 1859 total points.

Personal life
Hirayama is of Japanese Canadian descent and was born in Richmond, British Columbia, as were both his parents. Hirayama's father, Garry Hirayama, also represented Canada in both codes of the game in the 1980s, winning 12 caps as fly-half for the national team, and was also part of Canada's first sevens team to travel to Hong Kong. Together they are the first-ever rugby-playing father-son duo for Canada.

References

External links
 Nathan Hirayama at Rugby Canada
 
 
 

1988 births
Living people
Canada international rugby union players
Canadian rugby union players
Commonwealth Games rugby sevens players of Canada
Canada international rugby sevens players
Rugby sevens players at the 2015 Pan American Games
Rugby union fullbacks
Rugby union fly-halves
People from Richmond, British Columbia
Sportspeople from British Columbia
Canadian sportspeople of Japanese descent
Pan American Games gold medalists for Canada
Pan American Games medalists in rugby sevens
Rugby sevens players at the 2014 Commonwealth Games
Rugby sevens players at the 2010 Commonwealth Games
Rugby sevens players at the 2019 Pan American Games
Medalists at the 2015 Pan American Games
Medalists at the 2019 Pan American Games
Rugby sevens players at the 2020 Summer Olympics
Olympic rugby sevens players of Canada
Victoria Vikes athletes